The 1971 Tennessee State Tigers football team represented Tennessee State University as an independent during the 1971 NCAA College Division football season. In their ninth season under head coach John Merritt, the Tigers compiled a 9–1 record, defeated McNeese State in the Grantland Rice Bowl, and outscored all opponents by a total of 403 to 151. The team was also recognized as the 1971 black college national champion and was ranked No. 5 in the final 1971 NCAA College Division football rankings issued by the Associated Press and No. 14 in the final poll issued by the United Press International.

Schedule

References

Tennessee State
Tennessee State Tigers football seasons
Black college football national champions
Grantland Rice Bowl champion seasons
Tennessee State Tigers football